The College of Saint Mary-of-the-Wasatch was a private, Catholic women's college, later St. Mary of the Wasatch High School, located in Salt Lake City, Utah, from 1875 to 1969.  It was operated by the Sisters of the Holy Cross primarily as a sisters' college.

The school was located in the eastern reaches of Salt Lake City, in the foothills of the Wasatch Range.  In addition to being home to the college and high school, and later a high school only, it also housed a convent.  Starting in 1931, it was affiliated with the Sisters-run Holy Cross Hospital nursing college, which itself closed in 1973. It is the last place where teenager Reed Taylor Jeppson was seen in 1964.

Its records are held in the Sisters of the Holy Cross Archives in Notre Dame, Indiana.

References

External links
 Sisters of the Holy Cross Colleges
 Holy Cross Ministries: History

Educational institutions established in 1875
Saint Mary-of-the-Wasatch
Defunct Catholic universities and colleges in the United States
Saint Mary-of-the-Wasatch
Educational institutions disestablished in 1969
1875 establishments in Utah Territory
Catholic universities and colleges in Utah
1969 disestablishments in Utah
Sisters' colleges